Non-aligned Coalition is a conservative political party on the Åland Islands. It was founded in 1987. 
At the 2003 elections, the party won 9.4% of popular votes and 3 out of 30 seats.  In the 2007 Ålandic legislative election, the party won 11.9% of the popular vote and 4 out of 30 seats. In 2013 it was announced that the party would merge with the Moderates. All of the party's parliament members joined the Moderates to form Moderate Coalition for Åland. However the party survived as one of the original founders Bert Häggblom returned to recreate the party with new members. The party contested in the 2015 Ålandic legislative election and won 3 seats.

See also
 Lemland List

References

External links
 

Political parties in Åland
Conservative parties in Finland
Eurosceptic parties in Finland
Right-wing parties in Europe